Otakar Rademacher (4 July 1926 – 19 October 1991) was a Czechoslovak boxer and actor. He competed in the men's light heavyweight event at the 1948 Summer Olympics.

References

External links
 

1926 births
1991 deaths
Czech male boxers
Czech male actors
Czechoslovak male boxers
Olympic boxers of Czechoslovakia
Boxers at the 1948 Summer Olympics
People from Dvůr Králové nad Labem
Light-heavyweight boxers